The striped owl (Asio clamator) is a medium-sized owl with large ear tufts and a brownish-white facial disk rimmed with black.  Its beak is black, and it has cinnamon-colored eyes. It has shorter, rounder wings than most of its close relatives. The upperparts are cinnamon with fine black vermiculation and heavy stripes. The underparts are pale tawny with dusky streaks. It is native to South America and parts of Central America.

Taxonomy
The striped owl was formally described by the French ornithologist Louis Jean Pierre Vieillot in 1808 under the binomial name Bubo clamator. The specific epithet clamator is Latin meaning "shouter". The type locality is Cayenne in French Guiana. The striped owl was at one time placed in its own genus Rhinoptynx and was then transferred to the genus Pseudoscops. A molecular study that compared mitochondrial DNA sequences indicated that it should be placed in the genus Asio. This result was confirmed by a large molecular phylogenetic study of the owls published in 2019.

Description
The striped owl is a relatively large species with prominent tufts of elongated feathers on the crown resembling ears. Its head, back, hot wings and tail are brown with black stripes and small markings while its underparts are buff-coloured with heavy black streaking on the breast. The facial disk is pure white with a thin black border.

Distribution and habitat
The striped owl is native to much of South and Central America. Its range is not well known, perhaps because it is nocturnal and not easily seen, but it is known from Argentina, Belize, Bolivia, Brazil, Colombia, Costa Rica, Ecuador, El Salvador, French Guiana, Guatemala, Guyana, Honduras, Mexico, Nicaragua, Panama, Paraguay, Peru, Suriname, Trinidad and Tobago, Uruguay and Venezuela. It uses a variety of habitats, including riparian woodlands, marshes, savannahs, grassy open areas, and tropical rainforests.

Conservation status
The striped owl has a very large range and its population is believed to be stable. It faces no particular threats and is classified by the IUCN as least concern.

References

External links

Striped Owl videos on the Internet Bird Collection
Stamps (for Suriname) with RangeMap
Photo-Medium Res; Article borderland-tours
Striped Owl photo gallery VIREO

striped owl
Birds of Mexico
Birds of Central America
striped owl
striped owl
striped owl